The Piaye River is a river in Laborie Quarter of the island nation of Saint Lucia.

See also
List of rivers of Saint Lucia

References

Rivers of Saint Lucia